Kovil is a 2004 Indian Tamil-language romantic drama film written and directed by  Hari and produced by A. M. Rathnam. It stars Silambarasan and Sonia Agarwal while Vadivelu, Rajkiran, Charle and Nassar play supporting roles. The music was composed by Harris Jayaraj, with editing done by V. T. Vijayan and cinematography by Priyan. The film released on 10 January 2004 and became a box office hit.

Plot 

Puliyankulam and Veppankulam are nearby villages with an enmity lasting for a few generations. Periyasamy is a Hindu from Puliyankulam and is widely respected by the villagers. Michael Soosai is a devout Protestant from Veppankulam and does not trust other religions. Sakthivel is Periyasamy's son, who studies in a college in Nagercoil. Angel is Michael's daughter, who also attends the same college. Sakthivel and Angel meet in college and fall in love. Angel is afraid that her father will never allow her to marry a Hindu, especially from the rival village. Michael and Periyasamy learn about the relationship between Sakthivel and Angel. Michael gets enraged and scolds his daughter, while Periyasamy agrees for the wedding. Michael does not want an inter-religion marriage and decides to force his daughter to become a nun. Periyasamy arrives and tells the truth in front of everyone that Angel is Michael's adopted daughter who was born to Muslim parents. Michael realises his mistake and agrees for the wedding.

Cast

Production 
Filming was held in locations including Tenkasi, Coutralam, Nagercoil and Munnar, and was completed within 59 days.

Soundtrack 
The soundtrack was composed by Harris Jayaraj. All lyrics were written by Snehan, except for "Collegikku" (Na. Muthukumar).

Release and reception 
Kovil was released on 10 January 2004. Malathi Rangarajan of The Hindu praised Silambarasan's performance as being "restrained and mature". Sify reviewed the film more negatively, criticising its similarities to Alaigal Oivathillai (1981) and said, "Anyone who sees the film can find this out and is sure to compare it with the original". The reviewer appreciated Silambarasan because he was lacking "his usual mannerisms and style looks cool and is a relief to watch", although they criticised Aggarwal's performance and Harris Jayaraj's music. Visual Dasan of Kalki praised Hari for handling a controversial subject while also appreciating Priyan's cinematography and Harris Jayaraj's music. Malini Mannath wrote for Chennai Online, "The director's two earlier films Thamizh and Samy reveald him as a maker who thought differently. But this film is a routine, same romance, predictable and a little outdated".

References

External links 

2000s Tamil-language films
2004 films
2004 romantic drama films
Films directed by Hari (director)
Films scored by Harris Jayaraj
Films shot in Munnar
Indian interfaith romance films
Indian romantic drama films